Hiphopper may refer to:

Hip hop
Hiphopper, a cover of the song Punkrocker